Pop-Mechanics (Popular Mechanics) was a musical collective founded by Sergey Kuryokhin in 1984. The line-up of Pop-Mechanics often changed; musicians from rock groups such as Aquarium, Kino, Strannye Igry, AVIA, and Auktyon took part in its performances. Pop-Mechanics ceased to exist with Kuryokhin's death in 1996.

History 
Sergey Kuryokhin acted as the composer, conductor, and artistic director of Pop-Mechanics, as well as performing as a musician. The collective's performances were partly improvised and mixed genres, including elements of jazz, rock, avant-garde theater, and ancient mystery plays. The stage performances sometimes included animals.

The first Pop-Mechanics concert took place on 14 April 1984 in Moscow on the stage of the Moskvorechye House of Culture. The group's first performance in Leningrad took place in the spring of 1985 at a festival of the Leningrad Rock Club.

In 1988, Pop-Mechanics had their first international performances, including shows in Finland, Sweden, and Germany. From 1988 to 1991, the majority of Pop-Mechanics performances took place abroad. The group was less active after 1991.

Kuryokhin's final Pop-Mechanics show took place in Saint Petersburg in September 1995. The performance was also a fundraiser and advertisement for Aleksandr Dugin's Duma electoral campaign.

Pop-Mechanics participants 

With the exception of Kuryokhin, Pop-Mechanics did not have a permanent line-up. Participants in Pop-Mechanics shows included:

 † — show, avant-garde fashion
Kola Beldy — vocals
 — trumpet
 — saxophone
 — guitar
Sergey "Afrika" Bugayev — industrial group, electronic drums
Igor Butman — alto saxophone
 — saxophone
 — guitar
Vsevolod Gakkel — cello
 — maracas, industrial group, theatrics
Boris Grebenshchikov — guitar, theatrics
Georgy "Gustav" Guryanov † — industrial group, percussion, vocals
 — keyboards
Yuri Kasparyan — guitar
 — soprano saxophone, flute, recorder
 — tuba, vocals
 † — drums
 † — percussion
Elena Korikova — vocals, backing vocals
Sergey Letov — saxophone, bass clarinet, tenor saxophone
Yegor Letov † — bass guitar, guitar
Aleksandr Lipnitsky
 — guitar
 † — performances, show
Timur Novikov † — industrial group
Valentina Ponomaryova
 — saxophone
Arkady Shilkloper — French horn, jagdhorn
 — crumhorn
 † — guitar, theatrics
 — bass guitar, guitar, theatrics
Igor Tikhomirov — bass guitar
Alexander Titov — bass guitar
 Viktor Tsoi † — guitar
 — guitar, sound engineer
  † — viola
The British actress Vanessa Redgrave also took part in a Pop-Mechanics performance.

References

External links 
 Photo gallery (in Russian) — from Sergey Letov's personal archives
 Popular Mechanics on Russian Art Archive Network
Excerpt from BBC documentary Comrades: All that Jazz

Musical groups from Saint Petersburg
Musical groups disestablished in 1996
Musical groups established in 1984
Russian experimental musical groups
Russian rock music groups
Soviet rock music groups